Rutger McGroarty (born March 30, 2004) is an American collegiate ice hockey right wing for the University of Michigan of the National Collegiate Athletic Association (NCAA). He was drafted 14th overall by the Winnipeg Jets in the 2022 NHL Entry Draft.

Playing career
McGroarty spent two seasons with the USA Hockey National Team Development Program. He was the first player from the state of Nebraska to play for the national development program. During the 2020–21 season, he recorded 20 goals and 21 assists in 53 games. During the 2021–22 season, he recorded 35 goals and 34 assists in 54 games. He led the team in goals, and ranked fourth in points with 69. He competed at the 2022 BioSteel All-American Game where he recorded an assist and a goal with 2:37 left in regulation to force overtime. He was subsequently named the game's MVP. 

McGroarty is committed to play college ice hockey for the Michigan Wolverines during the 2022–23 season. He was drafted 14th overall by the Winnipeg Jets in the 2022 NHL Entry Draft.

International play

McGroarty represented the United States at the 2020 Winter Youth Olympics and won a silver medal.

McGroarty represented the United States at the 2021 IIHF World U18 Championships, where he was scoreless in five games. He again represented the United States at the 2022 IIHF World U18 Championships, where he served as team captain and recorded eight goals and one assist in six games and won a silver medal.

On December 12, 2022, McGroarty was named to the United States men's national junior ice hockey team to compete at the 2023 World Junior Ice Hockey Championships. During the tournament he recorded one goal and six assists in seven games and won a bronze medal.

Career statistics

Regular season and playoffs

International

Awards and honors

References

External links
 

2004 births
Living people
Ice hockey people from Nebraska
Ice hockey players at the 2020 Winter Youth Olympics
Michigan Wolverines men's ice hockey players
National Hockey League first-round draft picks
Sportspeople from Lincoln, Nebraska
USA Hockey National Team Development Program players
Winnipeg Jets draft picks
Youth Olympic silver medalists for the United States